The Department of the Environment, Water, Heritage and the Arts was an Australian Government department that existed between December 2007 and September 2010.

Scope
Information about the department's functions and/or government funding allocation could be found in the Administrative Arrangements Orders, the annual Portfolio Budget Statements and in the department's annual reports.

According to the Administrative Arrangements Order (AAO) made at the department's establishment, the department dealt with:
Environment protection and conservation of biodiversity
Air quality
National fuel quality standards
Land contamination
Meteorology
Administration of the Australian Antarctic Territory, and the Territory of Heard Island and McDonald Islands
Natural, built and movable cultural heritage
Environmental research
Water policy and resources
Cultural affairs, including support for the arts
There was a domestic Return of Indigenous Cultural Property (RICP) program run by DEWHA, which supported the return of both human remains and secret sacred objects from institutions within Australia. (At some point this functionality was incorporated in the International Repatriation Program (IRP), administered by the Department of Communications and the Arts.)
Ionospheric prediction
Community and household renewable energy programs

References

Environment, Water, Heritage and the Arts
Ministries established in 2007
2007 establishments in Australia
Australia